Sinoxylon ceratoniae is a species of horned powder-post beetles in the family Bostrichidae. It is found in Africa, Europe, and Northern Asia (excluding China).

References

 Borowski, Jerzy, and Piotr Wegrzynowicz (2007). World Catalogue of Bostrichidae (Coleoptera), 247.
 Ivie, Michael A. / Arnett, Ross H. Jr., Michael C. Thomas, Paul E. Skelley, et al., eds. (2002). "Family 69. Bostrichidae Latreille 1802". American Beetles, volume 2: Polyphaga: Scarabaeoidea through Curculionoidea, 233–244.

Further reading

 Arnett, R.H. Jr., M. C. Thomas, P. E. Skelley and J. H. Frank. (eds.). (2002). American Beetles, Volume II: Polyphaga: Scarabaeoidea through Curculionoidea. CRC Press LLC, Boca Raton, FL.
 
 Richard E. White. (1983). Peterson Field Guides: Beetles. Houghton Mifflin Company.

Bostrichidae
Beetles described in 1758
Taxa named by Carl Linnaeus